Chengyang District is a district of Qingdao, Shandong, People's Republic of China. The district is located at the northern outskirts of Qingdao City proper. Chengyang includes mountainous areas and plains and features sizable agriculture.

Transport
Line 1 and Line 8 of Qingdao Metro serve the district.

Chengyang railway station is located in Chengyang District.

Qingdao Liuting International Airport is located near the urban area of the district. The airport is closed and replaced by Qingdao Jiaodong International Airport. Qingdao Airlines has its headquarters in the district.

Administrative divisions
As 2012, this district is divided to 8 subdistricts.
Subdistricts

Education 
Malvern College Qingdao is located in this district.

References

External links 
 Information page

County-level divisions of Shandong
Geography of Qingdao
Districts of China